Tayuva lilacina is a species of sea slug, a dorid nudibranch, shell-less marine gastropod mollusks in the family Discodorididae. A number of species descriptions are considered to be synonyms.

Distribution
This species was described from Honolulu, Oahu, Sandwich Islands. It has been reported widely in the Indo-Central Pacific and from the Pacific coast of Mexico and the Canary Islands. This wide distribution suggests that it is probably a species complex, but it has been considered to be an invasive species.

Description
The maximum recorded body length is 50 mm or up to 120 mm.

Ecology
Minimum recorded depth is 0.5 m. Maximum recorded depth is 63 m.

Tayuva lilacina feeds on Haliclona caerulea according to the in situ observations on the Pacific coast of Mexico. It is probably highly specialized on this sponge.

References

Further reading
 Keen M. (1971). Sea shells of Tropical West America. Marine mollusks from Baja California to Perú. (2nd edit.). Stanford University Press pp. 1064
 Gofas, S.; Le Renard, J.; Bouchet, P. (2001). Mollusca, in: Costello, M.J. et al. (Ed.) (2001). European register of marine species: a check-list of the marine species in Europe and a bibliography of guides to their identification. Collection Patrimoines Naturels, 50: pp. 180–213
 Burn R. (2006) A checklist and bibliography of the Opisthobranchia (Mollusca: Gastropoda) of Victoria and the Bass Strait area, south-eastern Australia. Museum Victoria Science Reports 10:1–42.

External links
 

 

Discodorididae
Gastropods described in 1852